Hypercompe icasia is a moth of the family Erebidae first described by Pieter Cramer in 1777. It is widely distributed in South America and is also found on Martinique, Guadeloupe, Saint Martin, Dominica, St. Kitts, Nevis, St. Thomas, and Puerto Rico.

Larvae have been recorded feeding on Apium, Cecropia, Cissus, Citrus, Erechtites, Erythrina, Ipomoea, Musa, Phaseolus, Psidium, Solanum, and Vanilla species.

References

Hypercompe
Moths described in 1777
Taxa named by Pieter Cramer